Ward Perry (born March 20, 1970) is a Canadian voice actor and ADR script writer who has voiced characters for a number of anime dubbed in Vancouver, British Columbia, Canada. He is mostly known as the voice actor of Dragon Ball Z villain Dr. Wheelo, Rowen of the Strata in Ronin Warriors, and Geese Howard in the Fatal Fury animations. He retired in 2009 and has not made any new appearances on television since.

Credits

Voice Talent
 Adieu Galaxy Express 999 – Additional Voices
 Animated Classic Showcase – Various Characters
 Billy the Cat – Additional Voices
 Brain Powered – Gabriel Gaybridge
 Capertown Cops
 Death Note – Hitoshi Demegawa
 Dragon Ball Z (Ocean Group dub) – Kami (Dead Zone), King Yemma (Saiyan Saga), Dr. Wheelo, Turles, Sansho, Misokatsun
 Fatal Fury
 Fatal Fury: Legend of the Hungry Wolf – Geese Howard, Richard Meyer
 Fatal Fury 2: The New Battle – Geese Howard, Laurence Blood
 Fatal Fury: The Motion Picture – Laurence Blood, Geese Howard, Richard Meyer
 Galaxy Express 999 – Additional Voices
 G.I. Joe: Spy Troops – Agent Faces
 Gundam
 Mobile Suit Gundam – Ryu Jose
 Mobile Suit Gundam SEED – Kojiro Murdoch, Captain Zelman
 Mobile Suit Gundam SEED Destiny – Kojiro Murdoch
 Mobile Suit Gundam Wing – Howard, Otto, Pagan, Abdul, Marquise Weridge, Dr. J
 Mobile Suit Gundam: Encounters in Space – Ryu Jose
 Inuyasha – Wild Dog Princess, Serina and Suzuna's father, Gamajiro, Kawaramaru, Ongokuki, Additional Voices
 Inuyasha the Movie: Swords of an Honorable Ruler – Sō'unga
 Inuyasha the Movie: Fire on the Mystic Island – Gōra
 Key the Metal Idol – "A"
 MegaMan NT Warrior – StoneMan, DesertMan
 Monkey Magic – Jade Emperor, East General
 Monster Rancher – Big Blue, Datonare, Jagd Hound, Various
 Night Warriors: Darkstalkers' Revenge – Huitzil
 Project ARMS – Keith Red
 Ronin Warriors – Rowen of the Strata, Sekhmet
 Skysurfer Strike Force – Brad Wright
 Super Kid – Maio
 Transformers: Armada – Scavenger, Frustrated Guy
 Transformers: Energon  – Landmine
 Vision of Escaflowne (Ocean Group dub) – Gadess
 Escaflowne (Ocean Group dub) – Gaddes
 Warriors of Virtue – Villager
 X-Men: Evolution – Helicopter Pilot

Recording Assistant
 My Little Pony Tales

Dialogue Recording
 Spiff and Hercules

References

External links
 
 

1970 births
Canadian male video game actors
Canadian male voice actors
Living people
Male actors from British Columbia
20th-century Canadian male actors
21st-century Canadian male actors